Jordi Roca Grau (born 23 August 1989) is a Spanish footballer who plays for Andorran side Inter Club d'Escaldes as a midfielder.

Club career
Born in Premià de Mar, Barcelona, Catalonia, Roca made his senior debuts with UE Rubí. In the 2010 summer he joined Gimnàstic de Tarragona, after a stint at CD Blanes; he was assigned to the farm team in Tercera División.

On 8 September 2011 Roca played his first match as a professional, starting in a 0–6 away loss against Valladolid, in that season's Copa del Rey. He would spend the vast majority of his spell with the reserves, however.

On 19 July 2012 Roca signed for Segunda División B club CD Atlético Baleares. In September, however, he rescinded his link, and joined Terrassa FC in the fourth division on 8 October.

On 15 July 2013 Roca returned to Pobla, and appeared regularly during the campaign. In July 2014, he moved to Primera Catalana side UE Morell.

Roca joined Inter Club d'Escaldes in Andorra on 1 February 2020, after representing local sides CF Vilanova and CF Ampolla.

Honours
Inter d'Escaldes
Primera Divisió: 2019–20
Copa Constitució: 2020

References

External links

1989 births
Living people
People from Premià de Mar
Sportspeople from the Province of Barcelona
Spanish footballers
Footballers from Catalonia
Association football midfielders
Tercera División players
Primera Catalana players
Divisiones Regionales de Fútbol players
CF Pobla de Mafumet footballers
Gimnàstic de Tarragona footballers
CD Atlético Baleares footballers
Terrassa FC footballers
Primera Divisió players
Inter Club d'Escaldes players
Spanish expatriate footballers
Spanish expatriate sportspeople in Andorra
Expatriate footballers in Andorra